Strength athletics in Sweden refers to the participation of Swedish competitors and events in the field of strength athletics in association with the World's Strongest Man.

History
Sweden has a long and rich history of strength athletics dating back to the mid 1900s in the sport of Olympic weightlifting with Bo Johansson in the 1960s and 1970s, and several top ranked IPF Powerlifters such as Lars Hedlund and Lars Norén during the 1980s. Sweden has been at the top international level in World's Strongest Man since the very beginning in the late 1970s with Lars Hedlund achieving numerous podium finishes. Sweden struggled through the 1980s and early 1990s until the arrival of Magnus Samuelsson in 1995. Samuelsson would go on to win the 1998 World's Strongest Man, Sweden's only WSM title. Magnus continued to win major international contests and be a top podium finisher at WSM until his retirement in 2008. In recent years, Johannes Årsjö has continued to maintain Sweden's top position on the international scene with numerous podium finishes at major international contests.

National competitions

Sweden's Strongest Man

Sweden's Strongest Man is an annual strongman competition held in Sweden and featuring exclusively Swedish athletes. Magnus Samuelsson and Johannes Årsjö have both won the competition 9 times, thus currently (2017) sharing the record for most wins.

Top 3 placings

Regional Competitions

Nordic Strongman Championships
The Nordic Strongman Championships consists of athletes from Iceland, Norway, Sweden, Finland and Denmark.

References

Strongmen competitions
Sweden
Sport in Sweden